Cochliopodium is a Himatismenida genus.

It has been found in eyewash stations.

It includes:
 C. actinophorum (Auerbach 1856) Page 1976
 ?C. ambiguum Penard 1904
 C. arabianum Tekle, Gorfu & Anderson 2015
 C. barki Kudryavtsev, Brown et Smirnov 2004
 C. bilimbosum (Auerbach 1856) Leidy 1879
 C. clarum Schaeffer 1926
 ?C. crassiusculum Penard 1905
 ?C. erinaceum Penard 1902
 C. gallicum Kudryavtsev & Smirnov 2006
 C. granulatum Penard 1890
 C. gulosum Schaeffer 1926
 C. kieliense Kudryavtsev 2006
 C. larifeili Kudriavtsev 1999
 C. maeoticum Kudryavtsev 2006
 C. megatetrastylus Anderson & Tekle 2013
 C. minus Page 1976
 C. minutoidum Kudryavtsev 2006
 ?C. minutum West 1901
 ?C. muscorum Wang 1977
 ?C. obscurum Pen.
 ?C. papyrum Bovee 1958
 C. pentatrifurcatum Tekle et al. 2013
 C. plurinucleolum Geisen et al. 2014
 ?C. radiosum Biernacka 1963
 ?C. silvaticum Varga 1935
 C. spiniferum Kudryavtsev 2004
 ?C. spumosum Penard 1904
 C. vestitum (Archer 1871) Archer 1877

Recombination and Meiosis

The Cochliopodium genome includes genes whose functions are employed in the process of genetic recombination suggesting the possibility of a sexual stage.  The genome sequence of Cochliopodium minus contains a complete set of genes necessary for meiosis a key stage of sexual reproduction.

References

External links
(taxonomy information)

Amoebozoa genera
Discosea